Roger Acrode (also spelt Acroyde, Acrod) was Archdeacon of York from  1600 until 1617.

Acrode was educated at Clare College, Cambridge He held livings at Goldsborough, Whalton, and Bolton Percy.

References

1617 deaths
17th-century English Anglican priests
Archdeacons of York
Alumni of Clare College, Cambridge